Albion is an unincorporated community in Johnson Township, Scott County, in the U.S. state of Indiana.

History
Albion was laid out in 1837. The community's name Albion is an old term meaning Great Britain.

Geography

References

Unincorporated communities in Scott County, Indiana
Unincorporated communities in Indiana